

R

S

T

U

V

W

X

Y

Z

See also 

 List of electronic music record labels
 List of independent UK record labels

References

External links
45cat.com - record labels listed by country
discogs.com - searchable by label